"Culture" is the second episode of the second series of British TV sitcom Bottom. It was first broadcast on 8 October 1992. It is the second episode to feature only the two main characters.

Synopsis 
After falling behind with the rent, Richie and Eddie desperately try to find ways to entertain themselves after their television is taken back to Rumbelows.

Plot 
This episode begins with the pair doing a crossword. They get bored so Eddie tears up the paper. They then argue about whose fault it is that the television has been repossessed. Richie said that Eddie went to Rumbelows with the money to pay the rent, but instead gave the money to a strange and wizened old man in return for five magic beans. Eddie responds that Richie was going to the rental shop as he saved up the rent money every week for the past three month when they are only £86.23 behind, but instead went five doors down to Dr. O'Grady's personal organ enhancement clinic, and lose a mere £85 for having his personal organ enhanced (which turned out to be a scam).

Richie complains about his boredom, and then suggests playing 'Pin the Tail on the Donkey'. However, since there is nothing in the flat to play with, they end up playing 'put a bit of Sellotape on the fridge', in which Eddie wins. After this, Eddie suggests that they have a 'see how much custard you can fit in your underpants' competition, in which Richie wins after Eddie sits down, splattering his custard all over the room.

After cleaning up, they try to play with Richie's antique chess set that his Great Aunt Dorothy left him. Richie puts on a smoking jacket, which is actually his Mac, turned inside out. Richie tells Eddie that the chess set is the one that Wellington played with on the eve of the Battle of Waterloo. Here, it is made clear that Eddie has been stealing the valuable ivory chess pieces and selling them. Because there are only five pieces left, they have to play chess with different objects as the missing pieces such as frozen prawns (in place of pawns), a potted cactus, a tomato ketchup bottle, a large Spider-Man figurine and a toy skeleton. They also create cocktails using Pernod, Ouzo, marmalade and salt as ingredients, naming their creation the Esther Rantzen, as it 'pulls your gums over your teeth'. Just as they are about to start playing, Richie tells Eddie he does not know the rules of chess.

The episode then cuts to a few hours later; it is now 5:00am and Eddie has been up since 10:00pm telling Richie the rules of chess 124 times. They have been through the Ouzo, Pernod, Old Spice and all three litres of the industrial strength floor cleaner. By now, Eddie's nerves are frayed and he furiously forces Richie to begin the game. Having learned nothing over the previous seven hours, Richie acts out a war situation with his pieces, destroying half of them in the process and Eddie – realising that Richie still does not have a clue about the rules – moves his queen around the board several times in one go to confuse Richie, and then drags Richie's pieces over to his side, before declaring checkmate. Richie retaliates with a punch and they have a massive fight, in which Richie gets his feet crushed with a table, has a chair broken over his head and his head slammed in the fridge, but not before ramming the spike of an umbrella into Eddie's groin. Eddie talks to the viewer about how 'they say television encourages violence, well I'm smashing his face in and we haven't got one!' only for Richie to pull the television from behind the fridge and explain that it had not been taken; he had hidden it to see what a night without television would be like. He also hoped it would 'get a bit of interaction going'. Eddie obliges by smashing the television set over Richie's head.

References

Bottom (TV series)
1992 British television episodes